Milad Shabanloo is an Iranian football midfielder who plays for Shahin Bushehr.

Club career

Esteghlal
He made his debut for Esteghlal in 27th fixtures of 2015–16 Iran Pro League against Foolad while he substituted in for Farshid Esmaeili.

References

1995 births
Living people
Iranian footballers
Esteghlal F.C. players
Association football midfielders
People from Bushehr